Cephetola izidori is a butterfly in the family Lycaenidae. It is found in the Central African Republic, Kenya, Tanzania and Zambia.

Subspecies
Cephetola izidori izidori (Central African Republic, Kenya, north-western Tanzania)
Cephetola izidori zambeziae Libert & Collins, 1999 (Zambia)

References

Butterflies described in 1998
Poritiinae